The Bulwark class were the final class of wooden line-of-battle ships laid down for the Royal Navy. They were laid down after .

Origins
The consensus of British naval opinion after the Crimean War favoured the large steam-powered two-decker line-of-battle ship with 101 or 91 guns. The designs for two-decker evolved. "The 101-gun type were redesigned with an extra 400 tons and engines of 800 nhp, to produce the Duncan class. In the 1859 programme the two types were merged to produce a 91-gun ship with the dimensions of the 101-gun type. Two ships built on this plan - the Bulwark and Robust, the latter having been commenced as a 101-gun ship - were preserved on the stocks until 1872, the remaining seven being converted into ironclads. These last two-deckers were  overall, that they all displayed all the classic symptoms of weak construction, such as leaky seams, demonstrated that wood was no longer suitable for the construction of the largest classes of warships.

Britain's first sea-going iron-clad,  was laid down in May 1859, and a further three had been laid down by the end of 1859. Nevertheless, the Royal Navy continued to convert old sailing line-of-battle ships to steam, and to order and lay down new Bulwark-class two-deckers.  The objective was to achieve parity with the combined navies of France and Russia.  Initially there was great uncertainty about the value of iron-clads. So it was prudent to continue building unarmoured steam line-of-battle ships, which would in any case be "the common currency of sea-power for some years to come."

In March 1861, work on the Bulwark class was suspended.  They were retained on the stocks while the smaller  was launched on 27 March 1861.  The larger ships were better suited for conversion into iron-clads and were held in reserve for that purpose. Similarly, the sailing line-of-battle ships  and  completed their conversion to steam line-of-battle ships on 21 May and 25 June 1861 respectively.

Design 
The Bulwark class ships were a modification of the 101-gun Duncan-class design.  They had the same dimensions, but had a new timbering plan dated 29 July 1858, which suited the smaller armament.  The reduction in armament was intended to improve the efficiency of the guns.

Key Dates 
The following table shows key dates for the Bulwark class.

Conversion to iron-clads 
Bulwark and Robust were suspended on the stocks in March 1861 in an advanced state of construction.  The Controller "had plans prepared for the Bulwark to be converted into a twin turret breastwork monitor but they were never used.  As Edward Reed pointed out this was a wise policy as they would have been inferior to, and yet more costly than, iron-hulled ships built from scratch." "In war time the rapidity with which these ships might be converted into iron-clads would probably outweigh these considerations".  Bulwark and Robust were eventually broken up in March 1873 and August 1872 respectively.

The remaining seven ships of the Bulwark class were in a less complete state and were converted into 'ironclad frigates'.

Notes

References 

 Ballard, Admiral G.A.   The Black Battlefleet,  published Nautical Publications Co. and Society for Nautical Research, 1980.  
 Baxter, James Phinney   The Introduction of the Ironclad Warship,   published Harvard University, 1933.
 Conway  All the World's Fighting Ships 1860–1905,  published Conway Maritime Press, 1979.  
 Lambert, Andrew   Warrior, Restoring the World's First Ironclad,  published Conway Maritime Press, 1987.  
 Lambert, Andrew   Battleships in Transition, the Creation of the Steam Battlefleet 1815–1860,  published Conway Maritime Press, 1984.  
 Parkes, Oscar   British Battleships, first published Seeley Service & Co, 1957, published United States Naval Institute Press, 1990.  
 Reed, Edward J   Our Ironclad Ships, their Qualities, Performance and Cost,  published John Murray, 1869.

Battleship classes
 Bulwark class battleship
Ship classes of the Royal Navy
 Bulwark class battleship
Ship of the line classes